Amelia Țigănuș (born 11 March 1984 Galați) is a Romanian speaker, writer, and activist, who is a survivor of trafficking in women. She was trafficked to Spain, when she was sold to a pimp at age 17.  After five years of being sexually exploited, from 2002 to 2007, she managed to leave of the prostitution system. She lives in the Basque Country. She is the author of the book La revolta de las putas. From victim to activist (2021) in which she, in addition to narrating her experience, defends abolitionism as a way to confront prostitution and combat trafficking in women and girls.

Life 
Țigănuș was born into a working-class family, and grew up in Romania. She was gang raped on her way to school, which changed her life. Without the psychological support of her surroundings, and the emotional tools to recover from the shock of her minority, without legal support to process a complaint, the rapes continued and became systematic. Consequently, at the age of 13, she was forced to drop out of school.  She wanted to be a teacher or a doctor. At the age of 17, she was sold to a Spanish pimp for 300 euros.  She was initially prostituted in Alicante, being transferred to more than 40 brothels, which she calls concentration camps, for more than five years. In 2007, after a physical and emotional collapse, she escaped; and she has lived in it in the Basque Country.  ​7

After physically leaving prostitution (the psychological consequences remain0, Țigănuș began to study the theoretical thought of feminism, which provided a new interpretation of her own life. Starting in 2015, she coordinated the prostitution consumption prevention project, for three years on the Feminicidio.net web portal, expanding awareness and reflection workshops.  She participated in congresses organized both in Spain and in Latin America, giving lectures about her experiences and encouraging speeches on the abolition of prostitution.

She is a member of EHMA – Euskal Herriko Mugimendu Abolizionista (Abolitionist Movement of the Basque Country).  In 2021 she was one of the founders of the "Emargi" association, dedicated to fighting comprehensively for a future free of sexual and reproductive exploitation of women and girls, from its local, national and international dimension.

In 2021, the comic, Amelia, historia de un lucha, based on the life of Țigănuș drawn by Roberto García and written by Alicia Palmer and Țigănuș, was published as a tool to raise awareness of trafficking especially among youth.  In September 2021, Țigănuș published the book The Whore Revolt. From victim to activist, in which, beyond narrating her own experience, she points out the political and social implications and vindicates feminism as a framework of analysis.

Works 

 La revuelta de las putas. De víctima a activista (2021) Prólogo Rosa Cobo. Ediciones B. 224 pages. 
 Amelia. Historia de una lucha (2021) (Cómic) Amelia Tiganus (guion), Alicia Palmer (guion), Roberto García Peñuelas Editorial Serendipia. 80 pages,

References

External links 
 
 

1984 births
Romanian activists
Living people
People from Galați
21st-century Romanian writers
Romanian non-fiction writers
21st-century Romanian women writers
Victims of underage prostitution